Cyperus locuples is a species of sedge that is endemic to Nigeria.

The species was first formally described by the botanist Charles Baron Clarke in 1901.

See also
 List of Cyperus species

References

locuples
Taxa named by Charles Baron Clarke
Plants described in 1901
Flora of Nigeria